Don't Be Shy may refer to:

 "Don't Be Shy" (Arisa Mizuki song), 1995
 "Don't Be Shy" (Belly song), 2007
 "Don't Be Shy" (Kulcha song), 1994
 "Don't Be Shy" (Tiësto and Karol G song), 2021
"Don't Be Shy", a 1971 song by Cat Stevens written for the film Harold and Maude
"Don't Be Shy", a 2004 song by The Libertines off their album The Libertines
"Don't Be Shy", a 2008 song by Shwayze off his album Shwayze

See also
 "Don't Be So Shy", a song by French singer Imany